Sara's Notebook is a 2018 Spanish drama film directed by Norberto López Amado and written by Jorge Guerricaechevarría, about how Laura Alonso (Belén Rueda) searches for her missing sister in the Democratic Republic of Congo.

Cast

Release
Following a pre-screening on January 31, 2018 at Madrid's , the film was theatrically released in Spain on February 2, 2018, distributed by Buena Vista International. It was released on May 25, 2018 on Netflix streaming.

See also 
 List of Spanish films of 2018

References

External links 
 
 

2018 films
2018 drama films
Spanish drama films
Spanish-language Netflix original films
2010s Spanish-language films
2010s Spanish films
Buena Vista International films